Wind Lea was built in 1815 by Edward McCarty and his sons and is the oldest building in Keyser. The structure played an important role during the Civil War when it served both as a prison and a hospital.  The home is now divided into private residences.

(Source: Mineral County Chamber of Commerce)

References

Angus McDonald family of Virginia and West Virginia
Buildings and structures in Mineral County, West Virginia
Mineral County, West Virginia in the American Civil War
Stone houses in West Virginia
Vernacular architecture in West Virginia